Men in Black: The Game is an adventure video game developed by Gigawatt Studios for Microsoft Windows in 1997. Although it is an officially licensed game based on the 1997 film Men in Black, the plot is unrelated and it is a survival horror game as opposed to being a comedy. It is most likely an homage to the original The Men In Black comic book created by Lowell Cunningham with its dark aesthetics and 2D cinematics that resemble comic book panels. The game was ported to the PlayStation in 1998 by The Collective.

Gameplay
Men in Black: The Game is a survival horror game played from a third-person perspective, with fixed camera angles and pre-rendered backgrounds much like Resident Evil. The game is divided across four levels with each one includes puzzles that must be solved by the player to progress. Aside from the first level where you can only play as Agent J, the player can choose to be Agents J, K, or L in the other three levels. The dialogue changes based on which Agent you choose but the mission and game progression stay the same.

The player's character can jump, kick, punch, examine items, and dodge attacks. The player must find key cards, deactivate security systems, and read messages to proceed through each level, while fighting enemies that include grey aliens, large bugs, and spore frogs. Nine weapons are featured in the game, 2 are earthling weapons including a M1911 pistol(Only used by J.) and Sawed-off Shotgun and while 7 are alien weapons such as the neuralyzer and Noisy Cricket, both from the film. Only one weapon can be used for each level though a cheat code can allow players to carry all the weapons at once. Fist fights against enemies occur frequently due to a limited amount of ammunition. The Windows version does not support the use of a gamepad.

All cutscenes are shown in 2D animation in a style of a comic book. Aesthetically, both PC and PlayStation versions are identical except for the saving system; the former allows players to save manually at any point in the game whereas the latter can only be saved when accomplishing mission objectives.

Story
NYPD undercover officer James Darrell Edwards III is sent to investigate a robbery in an apartment. After successfully defusing a bomb and discovering the burglar is an alien, he is approached by Agent K, a member of the Men In Black organization, which monitors extraterrestrials living on Earth. Seeing as how skilful Edwards is, he recruits him and subsequently becomes Agent J.

In his first MIB meeting, Chief Zed briefs Agent J alongside K and L that they have lost contact with the MIB division located in the Artic and is sending one of the agents to investigate (in which the player gets to choose to be Agents J, K or L). After realizing the people there are suffering from delusions and a weird flu, the player discovers a secret alien lab underneath the Artic base. A self-destruct sequence is initiated and the player manages to escape in time.

Back in the MIB HQ, Zed sends the player to the Amazon, where there's been a report of bizarre occurrences and the mine workers claim of being attacked by non-humanoid beings. Upon arrival, the player finds an informer who confirms the report is true and that several workers have lost their sanity due to the shock. The player enters the mine and discovers several aliens inhabiting the area, including an alien bug that acts as their leader. After eliminating the threat, the player returns to base.

In a new briefing, the player learns the mining company is connected to Skip Frales, a computer mogul who lives in a remote island. Agent H was sent there to investigate but he has not been heard since. On the island, the player finds a secret alien underground base where Frales is hiding. Using alien technology, he builds a mech suit to eliminate the player, in which he fails.

After rescuing Agent H, Zed grants all agents who are involved in the operation a well-deserved 48 hour R&R.

Development and release
Gigawatt Studios had been interested in creating a Men in Black video game before the film was completed. SouthPeak Interactive announced the game in 1997, with plans to release it for Windows 95 on November 25 of that year, to coincide with the home video release of the film. Actors who appeared in the film had their faces texture mapped onto the game's character models. The game uses more than 200 backgrounds that were pre-rendered, while the model characters are made up of 500 polygons. The Windows version was released in the United States on November 18, 1997.

Reception

SouthPeak launched the game with a shipment of 100,000 units. In the United States alone, the computer version of Men in Black: The Game sold 4,883 copies and earned $200,989 by November 30, 1997. Between January 1998 and July 1998, it sold another 49,520 copies in the region, which drew an additional $1,423,382 in revenues.

Steve Poole of Computer Gaming World criticized the Windows version for its short length, its "strained attempts to duplicate the film's humor," and its lack of gamepad support. Poole wrote, "Serious gamers will be dissatisfied with the lack of depth, and casual gamers lured by the movie tie-in will be left cold by the game's average graphics and lethargic voice-acting."

Lauren Fielder of GameSpot criticized the game's artificial intelligence and poor controls, and wrote that the game might have been more fun if "you could at least run quickly." Fielder also criticized problems involving the player's ability to perform certain actions: "Unless you are lined up directly in front of your object, you can't act. And jumps are quite improbable even once you align yourself; for example, you can't hop up on a box unless you're right in front of it." Fielder concluded that "it's quite obvious the time and energy went into set design and mediocre character animations, not into actually making the game work." Fielder noted that the sound effects in the first level were "fairly interesting," but that "it too goes downhill, with your character's insistent one-liners and the endlessly looped 'climactic moment' music churning in the background."

Calvin Hubble of Game Revolution noted the poor artificial intelligence, but praised the character animations for bearing resemblance to their film counterparts, and wrote that the graphics were "decent enough to pass." However, Hubble noted that each of the game's menus and loading screens "have an extremely simple, bold, solid-color font. [...] I could have made a better interface given Photoshop and about a day." Kim Randell of Computer and Video Games called the game's first level "incredibly pedantic," and wrote, "The combat system is fiddly, and the murky backgrounds sometimes make your grasp of the scene less than complete. Later on it looks and sounds cool, but with a continuing frustration factor."

John Altman of Computer Games Magazine wrote, "As an action/adventure game, MiB is a qualified success – fairly entertaining but thoroughly unoriginal. As the latest product from the Men In Black franchise, the game is a disappointment; the original spirit has been lost, replaced by occasional wit and generous doses of carnage." Altman concluded, "Hardcore fans of MiB will be disappointed to discover that the game is fairly pedestrian and generic, but gamers know that few things in life go together as well as killing aliens and making droll remarks. There's fun to be found here; it's just a matter of keeping your expectations reasonable."

References

External links
 Men in Black: The Game at MobyGames

1997 video games
Adventure games
Gremlin Interactive games
PlayStation (console) games
SouthPeak Games
Video games about extraterrestrial life
Video games about police officers
Video games based on films
Video games based on Men in Black
Video games developed in the United States
Video games set in the Arctic
Video games set in New York City
Video games set in South America
Windows games
Single-player video games